Frances Winfield (1942 – April 21, 2019), was an American author and spokesperson.

Biography
Winfield was born in Saint Paul, Minnesota in 1942, and grew up in St. Louis and Old Greenwich, Connecticut. Winfield met her husband, Paul Bremer at a Dixieland concert. The two became college sweethearts and married in 1966. Bremer, a State Department official, served as the Administrator of the Coalition Provisional Authority of Iraq, Coordinator for Counterterrorism, United States Ambassador to the Netherlands, and Executive Secretary of the United States Department of State.

A devout Roman Catholic, she and her husband were extraordinary ministers of Holy Communion at their local parish in Maryland. They had two adult children.

After being diagnosed with Fibromyalgia, Winfield she became a spokeswoman for the National Fibromyalgia Association.

Winfield died on April 21, 2019, in Chevy Chase, Maryland.

Selected works
 Running to Paradise, 2000, 
 Coping With His Success:  A Survival Guide for Wives at the Top, 1984, 
 Walk A Mile In Her Shoes

References

  Web Opens New Window On Prayer, WaPo March 2, 2003
   Faith Gives Him Strength, The Catholic Standard, June 19, 2003
  Misty Valley Hosts Author of Paradise, August 2005

1942 births
2019 deaths
American non-fiction writers
Writers from Connecticut
Writers from Maryland